Colorado Plains Regional Airport  is a public-use airport located on the north side city limits of Akron, Colorado, a town in Washington County, Colorado, United States.

Facilities and aircraft 
It has one runway designated 11/29 with a  asphalt pavement.

For the 12-month period ending March 31, 2006, the airport had 21,220 aircraft operations, an average of 58 per day: 99% general aviation, 1% air taxi, <1% military and <1% scheduled commercial. At that time there were 17 aircraft based at this airport: 88% single-engine and 12% multi-engine.

Services: TSNT Storage (hangars and tiedowns), fuel (100LL, JET A1), courtesy car, public phone and computerized WX planning in FBO, aircraft and hangar rentals, instructional services, aerial spraying (April – October).

References

External links
 Colorado Plains Regional Airport (AKO) at Colorado DOT airport directory
 Hayes Aviation, the fixed-base operator (FBO)
 

Airports in Colorado
Buildings and structures in Washington County, Colorado
Transportation in Washington County, Colorado